Lawrence Brown (born September 4, 1963) is a former American football player who played as a wide receiver. Born in Miami, Florida, he attended American Senior High School and Mankato State University. He played one game in the National Football League (NFL) for the Minnesota Vikings during the 1987 strike, but failed to register a catch.

References

1963 births
Living people
Players of American football from Miami
American football wide receivers
Minnesota State Mavericks football players
Minnesota Vikings players
National Football League replacement players
Minnesota State University, Mankato alumni